Ukrainian may refer to:
 Dictionary definitions:
 Something of, from, or related to Ukraine
 Something relating to Ukrainians
 Something relating to demographics of Ukraine 
 Something relating to Ukrainian culture
 Ukrainian language
 Ukrainian alphabet, of Cyrillic form
 Ukrainian cuisine

See also

 Languages of Ukraine
 Name of Ukraine
 Ukrainian Orthodox Church (disambiguation)
 Ukrainians (disambiguation)
 Ukraine (disambiguation)
 Ukraina (disambiguation)
 Ukrainia (disambiguation)
 

Language and nationality disambiguation pages